The North Carolina Tar Heels college football team competes as part of the National Collegiate Athletic Association (NCAA) Division I Football Bowl Subdivision (FBS), and represents the University of North Carolina at Chapel Hill in the Coastal Division of the Atlantic Coast Conference (ACC). All-America selections are individual player recognitions made after each season when numerous publications release lists of their ideal team. The NCAA recognizes five All-America lists: the Associated Press (AP), American Football Coaches Association (AFCA), the Football Writers Association of America (FWAA), Sporting News (TSN), and the Walter Camp Football Foundation (WC). In order for an honoree to earn a "consensus" selection, he must be selected as first team in three of the five lists recognized by the NCAA, and "unanimous" selections must be selected as first team in all five lists.

Since the establishment of the team in 1888, North Carolina has had 68 players honored a total of 85 times as an All-American for their performance on the field of play. Included in these selections are fourteen consensus selections, three of which were unanimous selections. The most recent All-Americans from North Carolina a came after the 2013 season, when Eric Ebron and Ryan Switzer were each named First Team All-America by various selectors.

Key

Selectors

Selections

Notes

References

General

 

Specific

North Carolina Tar Heels

North Carolina Tar Heels football All-Americans